Rusty Hill (born December 27, 1970) is an American sports shooter. He competed in the men's 10 metre running target event at the 1992 Summer Olympics.

References

External links
 

1970 births
Living people
American male sport shooters
Olympic shooters of the United States
Shooters at the 1992 Summer Olympics
Sportspeople from Orange, California